The Greek Athletics Championships is an annual track and field competition which serves as the national championship for Greece. It is organised by the Hellenic Amateur Athletic Association, Greece's national governing body for the sport of athletics. The winner of each event at the championships is declared the national champion for that year. The men's and women's championships are contested separately, with the men's championships first being held in 1896 and the women's in 1930. Greek Cypriot athletes frequently compete at the championships and there have been several Cypriot winners.

Men

100 metres
1983: Kosmas Stratos
1984: Theodoros Gatsios
1985: Kosmas Stratos
1986: Kosmas Stratos
1987: Michalis Vagenas
1988: Kosmas Stratos
1989: ?
1990: Kostas Lambropoulos
1991: Alexandros Yenovelis
1992: Georgios Panagiotopoulos
1993: Alexandros Terzian
1994: Alexandros Terzian
1995: Alexios Alexopoulos
1996: Haralabos Papadias
1997: 
1998: Haralabos Papadias
1999: Georgios Theodoridis
2000: Angelos Pavlakakis
2001: Konstantinos Kenteris
2002: Aristotelis Gavelas
2003: Aristotelis Gavelas
2004: Konstantinos Kenteris
2005: Panagiotis Sarris
2006: Anastasios Goussis

200 metres
1983: 
1984: Theodoros Gatsios
1985: Georgios Vamvakas
1986: Theodoros Gatsios
1987: Michalis Vagenas
1988: Vassilios Kallipossis
1989: ?
1990: Charalambos Papanikolaou
1991: Georgios Panagiotopoulos
1992: Thomas Sbokos
1993: Alexandros Terzian
1994: Georgios Panagiotopoulos
1995: Thomas Sbokos
1996: Thomas Sbokos
1997: Georgios Panagiotopoulos
1998: 
1999: Konstantinos Kenteris
2000: Anastasios Goussis
2001: 
2002: Konstantinos Kenteris
2003: Georgios Doupis
2004: Anastasios Goussis
2005: Anastasios Goussis
2006: Anastasios Goussis

400 metres
1983: Panagiotis Stefanapoulos
1984: Angelos Soultanis
1985: Stergios Kallipossis
1986: Vassilios Kallipossis
1987: Georgios Panagiotopoulos
1988: Georgios Panagiotopoulos
1989: ?
1990: Charalambos Rethemiotakis
1991: Konstantinos Kenteris
1992: Konstantinos Kenteris
1993: Konstantinos Kenteris
1994: 
1995: 
1996: 
1997: Konstantinos Moumoulidis
1998: Konstantinos Kenteris
1999: Konstantinos Kenteris
2000: Anastasios Goussis
2001: Anastasios Goussis
2002: Stelios Demotsios
2003: Stelios Demotsios
2004: Anastasios Goussis
2005: Dimitrios Gravalos
2006: Dimitrios Regas

800 metres
1983: Vanasios Papoutsis
1984: Panagiotis Stefanapoulos
1985: Sotirios Moutsanas
1986: Sotirios Moutsanas
1987: 
1988: Nikos Vouzis
1989: ?
1990: Spyros Christopoulos
1991: Fotis Deligiannis
1992: Fotis Deligiannis
1993: Michalis Anagnostou
1994: Michalis Anagnostou
1995: Panagiotis Stroubakos
1996: Panagiotis Stroubakos
1997: Panagiotis Stroubakos
1998: Panagiotis Stroubakos
1999: Panagiotis Stroubakos
2000: Panagiotis Stroubakos
2001: Panagiotis Stroubakos
2002: Panagiotis Stroubakos
2003: Sotirios Papadias
2004: Panagiotis Stroubakos
2005: Pavlos Farougias
2006: Efthimios Papadopoulos

1500 metres
1983: Arsenios Tsiminos
1984: Fotis Kourtis
1985: Nikolaos Tsiakoulas
1986: Nikolaos Tsiakoulas
1987: Sotirios Moutsanas
1988: Nikos Vouzis
1989: ?
1990: Spyros Christopoulos
1991: Iosif Kelaidis
1992: Panagiotis Stroubakos
1993: Spyros Christopoulos
1994: Dimitrios Katsoulis
1995: Panagiotis Papoulias
1996: Stavros Karres
1997: 
1998: Panagiotis Papoulias
1999: 
2000: Stavros Karres
2001: Pavlos Farougias
2002: Panagiotis Ikonomou
2003: Kostas Karakatsanis
2004: Kostas Karakatsanis
2005: Panagiotis Ikonomou
2006: Panagiotis Ikonomou

5000 metres
1983: Fotis Kourtis
1984: Manolis Chantzos
1985: Manolis Chantzos
1986: Spyros Andriopoulos
1987: Panagiotis Fotiou
1988: Panagiotis Fotiou
1989: ?
1990: Spyros Andriopoulos
1991: Nikos Vouzis
1992: Nikos Vouzis
1993: Panagiotis Papoulias
1994: Panagiotis Papoulias
1995: Panagiotis Charamis
1996: Panagiotis Charamis
1997: Antonios Vouzis
1998: Panagiotis Papoulias
1999: Antonios Papantonis
2000: Panagiotis Charamis
2001: Anastasios Frangos
2002: Antonios Papantonis
2003: Panagiotis Papoulias
2004: Michalis Yelasakis
2005: Anastasios Frangos
2006: Pantelis Savopoulos

10,000 metres
1983: Marios Kassianidis
1984: Spyros Andriopoulos
1985: Spyros Andriopoulos
1986: Spyros Andriopoulos
1987: Spyros Andriopoulos
1988: Savvas Kouburas
1989: ?
1990: Spyros Andriopoulos
1991: Spyros Andriopoulos
1992: Manolis Chantzos
1993: Manolis Chantzos
1994: Panagiotis Charamis
1995: Spyros Andriopoulos
1996: Panagiotis Charamis
1997: Panagiotis Charamis
1998: Panagiotis Charamis
1999: Antonios Papantonis
2000: Panagiotis Charamis
2001: Christos Zarkadis
2002: Ioannis Kanellopoulos
2003: Michalis Yelasakis
2004: Michalis Yelasakis
2005: Michalis Yelasakis
2006: Michalis Yelasakis

Marathon
1983: Anastasios Psathas
1984: Michalis Kousis
1985: Michalis Kousis
1986: Anastasios Psathas
1987: Georgios Afordakos
1988: Georgios Afordakos
1989: Christos Papachristos
1990: Georgios Malliaris
1991: Theodoros Fotopoulos
1992: Christos Sotiropoulos
1993: Nikolaos Polias
1994: Spyros Andriopoulos
1995: Nikolaos Polias
1996: Nikolaos Polias
1997: Spyros Andriopoulos
1998: Nikitas Marakakis
1999: Nikolaos Polias
2000: Nikolaos Polias
2001: Nikolaos Polias
2002: Vassilios Zabelis
2003: Nikolaos Polias
2004: Konstantinos Gougousis
2005: Gerasimos Kokotos

3000 metres steeplechase
1983: Arsenios Tsiminos
1984: Fotis Kourtis
1985: Kyriakos Moutesidis
1986: Kyriakos Moutesidis
1987: Christos Papachristos
1988: Kyriakos Moutesidis
1989: ?
1990: Panagiotis Karachalios
1991: Stavros Figetakis
1992: Antonios Vouzis
1993: Antonios Vouzis
1994: Antonios Vouzis
1995: Antonios Vouzis
1996: Georgios Giannelis
1997: Antonios Vouzis
1998: Georgios Giannelis
1999: Georgios Giannelis
2000: Nikolaos Maxouris
2001: Georgios Kompogiannis
2002: Georgios Kompogiannis
2003: Christoforos Meroussis
2004: Naim Akrout
2005: Alexandros Litsis
2006: Naim Akrout

110 metres hurdles
1983: 
1984: Georgios Tsiantas
1985: Georgios Tsiantas
1986: Grigorios Zagoras
1987: Stelios Bisbas
1988: Stelios Bisbas
1989: ?
1990: Dimitrios Siatounis
1991: Grigorios Siatounis
1992: Stelios Bisbas
1993: Stelios Bisbas
1994: Dimitrios Siatounis
1995: Stelios Bisbas
1996: Stelios Bisbas
1997: Stamatios Magos
1998: Dimitrios Siatounis
1999: Stamatios Magos
2000: Dimitrios Siatounis
2001: Dimitrios Pietris
2002: Dimitrios Pietris
2003: Dimitrios Pietris
2004: Ioannis Marakakis
2005: Alexandros Theofanov
2006: Theopistos Mavridis

400 metres hurdles
1983: Georgios Vamvakas
1984: Georgios Vamvakas
1985: Georgios Vamvakas
1986: Athanassios Kalogiannis
1987: Georgios Vamvakas
1988: Athanassios Kalogiannis
1989: ?
1990: Athanassios Kalogiannis
1991: Dimitrios Marinakis
1992: Athanassios Kalogiannis
1993: Athanassios Kalogiannis
1994: Panagiotis Mantelidis
1995: Panagiotis Mantelidis
1996: Panagiotis Mantelidis
1997: Panagiotis Mantelidis
1998: Periklis Iakovakis
1999: Periklis Iakovakis
2000: Periklis Iakovakis
2001: Periklis Iakovakis
2002: Periklis Iakovakis
2003: Periklis Iakovakis
2004: Periklis Iakovakis
2005: Periklis Iakovakis
2006: Periklis Iakovakis

High jump
1983: Panagiotis Panayos
1984: Dimitrios Kattis
1985: Kosmas Mikhalopoulos
1986: Kosmas Mikhalopoulos
1987: Panagiotis Kondaxakis
1988: Lambros Papakostos
1989: ?
1990: Lambros Papakostos
1991: Lambros Papakostos
1992: Lambros Papakostos
1993: Lambros Papakostos
1994: Dimitrios Kokotis
1995: Lambros Papakostos
1996: Ioannis Yantsios
1997: Lambros Papakostos
1998: Dimitrios Kokotis
1999: Konstantinos Liapis
2000: Lambros Papakostos
2001: Dimitrios Syrakos
2002: 
2003: 
2004: Dimitrios Syrakos
2005: 
2006: Nikolaos Giosis

Pole vault
1983: Andreas Tsonis
1984: Andreas Tsonis
1985: Symeon Anastasiadis
1986: Andreas Tsonis
1987: Dimitrios Kirkos
1988: Andreas Tsonis
1989: ?
1990: Georgios Katsaris
1991: Christos Pallakis
1992: Christos Pallakis
1993: Christos Pallakis
1994: Christos Pallakis
1995: Christos Pallakis
1996: Konstantinos Tsatalos
1997: Konstantinos Tzivas
1998: Stavros Tsitouras
1999: Stavros Tsitouras
2000: Marios Evangelou
2001: Marios Evangelou
2002: Filippos Sgouros
2003: Stavros Kouroupakis
2004: Marios Evangelou
2005: Konstantinos Filippidis
2006: Stavros Kouroupakis

Long jump
1983: Dimitrios Delifotis
1984: Michalis Filandarakis
1985: Charalambos Giannoulis
1986: Georgios Tsiantas
1987: Theodoros Tantanozis
1988: Dimitrios Delifotis
1989: ?
1990: Konstandinos Koukodimos
1991: Konstandinos Koukodimos
1992: Konstandinos Koukodimos
1993: Spyridon Vasdekis
1994: Konstandinos Koukodimos
1995: Konstandinos Koukodimos
1996: Spyridon Vasdekis
1997: Konstandinos Koukodimos
1998: Spyridon Vasdekis
1999: Konstandinos Koukodimos
2000: Konstandinos Koukodimos
2001: Konstandinos Koukodimos
2002: Konstandinos Koukodimos
2003: Louis Tsatoumas
2004: Louis Tsatoumas
2005: Louis Tsatoumas
2006: Louis Tsatoumas

Triple jump
1983: Ioannis Kyriakis
1984: Dimitrios Mikhas
1985: Charalambos Giannoulis
1986: Charalambos Giannoulis
1987: Charalambos Giannoulis
1988: 
1989: ?
1990: Theodoros Tantanozis
1991: Theodoros Tantanozis
1992: Spyros Kourmoussis
1993: Theodoros Tantanozis
1994: Hristos Meletoglou
1995: 
1996: Hristos Meletoglou
1997: Hristos Meletoglou
1998: Hristos Meletoglou
1999: Christos Tzortzatos
2000: Stamatios Lenis
2001: Hristos Meletoglou
2002: Konstadinos Zalagitis
2003: Hristos Meletoglou
2004: Hristos Meletoglou
2005: Konstadinos Zalagitis
2006: Konstadinos Zalagitis

Shot put
1983: 
1984: Vassilios Manganas
1985: Dimitrios Koutsoukis
1986: Dimitrios Koutsoukis
1987: Dimitrios Koutsoukis
1988: Dimitrios Koutsoukis
1989: ?
1990: 
1991: Dimitrios Koutsoukis
1992: Dimitrios Koutsoukis
1993: 
1994: Kostas Kollias
1995: Kostas Kollias
1996: 
1997: Alexandros Leonidis
1998: Vaios Tigas
1999: 
2000: Vaios Tigas
2001: Vaios Tigas
2002: Vaios Tigas
2003: Panagiotis Baharidis
2004: Michalis Stamatogiannis
2005: Andreas Anastasopoulos
2006: Andreas Anastasopoulos

Discus throw
1983: Kostas Georgakopoulos
1984: Kostas Georgakopoulos
1985: Kostas Georgakopoulos
1986: Kostas Georgakopoulos
1987: Kostas Georgakopoulos
1988: Kostas Georgakopoulos
1989: ?
1990: Kostas Georgakopoulos
1991: Angelos Nikolaidis
1992: Kostas Georgakopoulos
1993: Christos Papadopoulos
1994: Christos Papadopoulos
1995: Kostas Georgakopoulos
1996: Christos Papadopoulos
1997: ?
1998: Christos Papadopoulos
1999: Savvas Panavoglou
2000: Stefanos Konstas
2001: Savvas Panavoglou
2002: Stefanos Konstas
2003: Alexandros Ganotakis
2004: Stefanos Konstas
2005: Stefanos Konstas
2006: Stefanos Konstas

Hammer throw
1983: Ioannis Magos
1984: Panagiotis Kremastiotis
1985: Triantafillos Apastolidis
1986: Triantafillos Apastolidis
1987: Triantafillos Apastolidis
1988: Triantafillos Apastolidis
1989: ?
1990: Georgios Nalsatsiadis
1991: Savvas Saritzoglou
1992: Savvas Saritzoglou
1993: Savvas Saritzoglou
1994: Alexandros Papadimitriou
1995: Alexandros Papadimitriou
1996: Alexandros Papadimitriou
1997: Alexandros Papadimitriou
1998: Hristos Polihroniou
1999: Hristos Polihroniou
2000: Alexandros Papadimitriou
2001: Hristos Polihroniou
2002: Alexandros Papadimitriou
2003: Alexandros Papadimitriou
2004: Alexandros Papadimitriou
2005: Alexandros Papadimitriou
2006: Alexandros Papadimitriou

Javelin throw
1983: Ioannis Peristeris
1984: Antonios Papadimitriou
1985: Antonios Papadimitriou
1986: Antonios Papadimitriou
1987: Ioannis Peristeris
1988: Ioannis Peristeris
1989: Athanasios Peristeris
1990: Athanasios Peristeris
1991: Athanasios Peristeris
1992: Konstadinos Gatsioudis
1993: Konstadinos Gatsioudis
1994: Dimitrios Polymerou
1995: Dimitrios Polymerou
1996: Dimitrios Polymerou
1997: Dimitrios Polymerou
1998: Dimitrios Polymerou
1999: Konstadinos Gatsioudis
2000: Konstadinos Gatsioudis
2001: Konstadinos Gatsioudis
2002: Dimitrios Polymerou
2003: Georgios Iltsios
2004: Georgios Iltsios
2005: Eleutherios Karasmanakis
2006: Georgios Iltsios

Decathlon
1983: Ioannis Mavrikis
1984: Ioannis Mavrikis
1985: Athanasios Pampaliaris
1986: Athanasios Pampaliaris
1987: Athanasios Pampaliaris
1988: Athanasios Pampaliaris
1989: ?
1990: ?
1991: ?
1992: Savvas Stafilidis
1993: Savvas Stafilidis
1994: Michalis Simitzis
1995: Savvas Stafilidis
1996: Prodromos Korkizoglou
1997: Konstantinos Papadopoulos
1998: Prodromos Korkizoglou
1999: Prodromos Korkizoglou
2000: 
2001: Pavlos Kouromihalakis
2002: Prodromos Korkizoglou
2003: Prodromos Korkizoglou
2004: Efthimios Andreoglou
2005: Michalis Papaioannou
2006: Konstantinos Karamousalis

20,000 metres walk
1985: Aris Karageorgios
1986: Christos Karageorgios
1987: Dimitrios Orfanopoulos
1988: Christos Karageorgios
1989: ?
1990: Christos Karageorgios
1991: ?
1992: Spyridon Kastanis
1993: Theodoros Stamatopoulos
1994: Spyridon Kastanis
1995: Dimitrios Orfanopoulos
1996: Not held
1997: Spyridon Kastanis
1998: Spyridon Kastanis

20 kilometres walk
1984: Christos Karageorgios
1985: Not held
1986: Not held
1987: Not held
1988: Not held
1989: ?
1990: Not held
1991: ?
1992: Not held
1993: Not held
1994: Not held
1995: Not held
1996: Dimitrios Orfanopoulos
1997: Not held
1998: Not held
1999: Spyridon Kastanis
2000: Theodoros Stamatopoulos
2001: Theodoros Stamatopoulos
2002: Georgios Argiropoulos
2003: Theodoros Stamatopoulos
2004: Theodoros Stamatopoulos
2005: Theodoros Koupidis
2006: Theodoros Koupidis

50 kilometres walk
1990: Spyridon Kastanis
1991: Spyridon Kastanis
1992: Dimitrios Orfanopoulos
1993: ?
1994: Spyridon Kastanis
1995: ?
1996: Spyridon Kastanis
1997: Andreas Stamatopoulos
1998: Spyridon Kastanis
1999: Spyridon Kastanis
2000: Spyridon Kastanis
2001: Spyridon Kastanis
2002: Spyridon Kastanis
2003: Georgios Argiropoulos
2004: Theodoros Stamatopoulos
2005: Konstantinos Stefanopoulos

Women

100 metres
1983: 
1984: Georgia Drakopoulou
1985: Natasa Bardopoulou
1986: Marina Skordi
1987: Marina Skordi
1988: Voula Patoulidou
1989: ?
1990: Voula Patoulidou
1991: Marina Vasarmidou
1992: Voula Patoulidou
1993: Ekaterini Koffa
1994: Ekaterini Koffa
1995: Ekaterini Thanou
1996: Ekaterini Koffa
1997: Ekaterini Koffa
1998: Panayota Koutrouli
1999: Ekaterini Koffa
2000: Ekaterini Thanou
2001: Ekaterini Thanou
2002: Ekaterini Thanou
2003: Marina Vasarmidou
2004: Ekaterini Thanou
2005: Maria Karastamati
2006: Georgia Kokloni

200 metres
1983: Alexandra Siouli
1984: Georgia Drakopoulou
1985: Natasa Bardopoulou
1986: Marina Skordi
1987: Marina Skordi
1988: Georgia Zouganeli
1989: ?
1990: Georgia Zouganeli
1991: Marina Vasarmidou
1992: Ekaterini Koffa
1993: Ekaterini Koffa
1994: Efrosini Patsou
1995: Ekaterini Koffa
1996: Ekaterini Koffa
1997: Marina Vasarmidou
1998: 
1999: Ekaterini Koffa
2000: Ekaterini Koffa
2001: Olga Kaidantzi
2002: Olga Kaidantzi
2003: Olga Kaidantzi
2004: Olga Kaidantzi
2005: 
2006:

400 metres
1983: 
1984: Artemis Vassilakopoulou
1985: Artemis Vassilakopoulou
1986: Artemis Vassilakopoulou
1987: Chionati Kapeti
1988: Natasa Bardopoulou
1989: ?
1990: Sofia Mavromati
1991: Eleni Papadopoulos
1992: Marina Vasarmidou
1993: 
1994: Ekaterini Galliti
1995: Ekaterini Galliti
1996: 
1997: 
1998: 
1999: Christina Panagou
2000: Marina Vasarmidou
2001: Christina Panagou
2002: Chrysoula Goudenoudi
2003: Chrysoula Goudenoudi
2004: Chrysoula Goudenoudi
2005: Dimitra Dova
2006: Dimitra Dova

800 metres
1983: Stavroula Konstantidinou
1984: Klaudia Tsakelidou
1985: Georgia Troumbouki
1986: Irini Theodoridou
1987: Irini Theodoridou
1988: Georgia Troumbouki
1989: ?
1990: Karolina Skourti
1991: Irini Theodoridou
1992: Paulina Evro
1993: Vassiliki Vraka
1994: Irini Akrivou
1995: Karolina Skourti
1996: Theoni Kostopolou
1997: Theoni Kostopolou
1998: Karolina Skourti
1999: Konstantina Liapikou
2000: Ekaterini Koutala
2001: Anastasia Mylona
2002: 
2003: 
2004: Eleni Filandra
2005: Eleni Filandra
2006: Eleni Filandra

1500 metres
1983: Stavroula Konstantidinou
1984: Aspasia Potou
1985: Georgia Troumbouki
1986: Irini Theodoridou
1987: Irini Theodoridou
1988: Dimitra Anagnostou
1989: ?
1990: Irini Theodoridou
1991: Irini Theodoridou
1992: Paulina Evro
1993: Theoni Kostopolou
1994: Irini Akrivou
1995: Maria Protopappa
1996: Irini Akrivou
1997: Karolina Skourti
1998: Karolina Skourti
1999: Chrysostomia Iakovou
2000: Maria Tsirba
2001: Karolina Skourti
2002: Maria Tsirba
2003: Konstantina Efentaki
2004: Konstantina Efentaki
2005: Konstantina Efentaki
2006: Maria Dalaka

3000 metres
1983: Ekaterini Dori
1984: Ekaterini Dori
1985: Dimitra Papaspyrou
1986: Not held
1987: Dimitra Papaspyrou
1988: Dimitra Anagnostou
1989: ?
1990: Georgia Tsafou
1991: Georgia Ambatzidou
1992: 
1993: Maria Polyzou
1994: Chrysostomia Iakovou
1995: Not held
1996: Maria Polyzou

5000 metres
1986: Dimitra Papaspyrou
1987: Not held
1988: Not held
1989: Not held
1990: Not held
1991: Not held
1992: Not held
1993: Not held
1994: Not held
1995: Chrysostomia Iakovou
1996: Maria Polyzou
1997: Chrysostomia Iakovou
1998: Spyridoula Souma
1999: Chrysostomia Iakovou
2000: Maria Polyzou
2001: Chrysostomia Iakovou
2002: Maria Protopappa
2003: Maria Protopappa
2004: Maria Protopappa
2005: Maria Protopappa
2006: Kalliopi Astropekaki

10,000 metres
1988: Dimitra Papaspyrou
1989: ?
1990: Dimitra Papaspyrou
1991: Dimitra Anagnostou
1992: Dimitra Anagnostou
1993: Chrysostomia Iakovou
1994: Georgia Ambatzidou
1995: Olga Tektonidou-Parlyuk
1996: Not held
1997: Georgia Ambatzidou
1998: Spyridoula Souma
1999: Spyridoula Souma
2000: Georgia Ambatzidou
2001: Spyridoula Souma
2002: Georgia Ambatzidou
2003: Georgia Ambatzidou
2004: Georgia Ambatzidou
2005: Ekaterini Asimakopoulou
2006: Ekaterini Asimakopoulou

Marathon
1982: Alexandra Fili
1983: Despina Sfakianaki
1984: Georgia Papanastasiou
1985: Georgia Papanastasiou
1986: Georgia Papanastasiou
1987: Magda Poulimenou
1988: Maria Polyzou
1989: Maria Polyzou
1990: Sofia Sotiriadou
1991: Sofia Sotiriadou
1992: Paraskevi Kastriti
1993: Panayota Petropoulou
1994: Maria Polyzou
1995: Panayota Nikolakopoulou
1996: Panayota Nikolakopoulou
1997: Panayota Nikolakopoulou
1998: Panayota Nikolakopoulou
1999: Panayota Nikolakopoulou
2000: Vassiliki Sikopeti
2001: Georgia Ambatzidou
2002: Georgia Ambatzidou
2003: Georgia Ambatzidou
2004: Georgia Ambatzidou
2005: Georgia Ambatzidou

3000 metres steeplechase
2001: Konstantina Efentaki
2002: Eleni Bikaki
2003: Pagona Sakellari
2004: Konstantina Kefala
2005: Maria Pardalou
2006: Irini Kokinariou

100 metres hurdles
1983: Elissavet Pantazi
1984: Chionati Kapeti
1985: ?
1986: Elissavet Pantazi
1987: Elissavet Pantazi
1988: Angeliki Stogiannoudi
1989: Voula Patoulidou
1990: ?
1991: Angeliki Stogiannoudi
1992: Voula Patoulidou
1993: Hristiana Tabaki
1994: Maria Zaharia
1995: Angeliki Stogiannoudi
1996: Hristiana Tabaki
1997: Hristiana Tabaki
1998: Flora Redoumi
1999: Hristiana Tabaki
2000: Hristiana Tabaki
2001: Flora Redoumi
2002: Hristiana Tabaki
2003: Hristiana Tabaki
2004: Flora Redoumi
2005: Flora Redoumi
2006: Alexandra Komnou

400 metres hurdles
1983: 
1984: Chrisanthi Girousi
1985: ?
1986: Chionati Kapeti
1987: Chionati Kapeti
1988: Anna Rodakou
1989: ?
1990: Chionati Kapeti
1991: Chionati Kapeti
1992: Irini Sina
1993: Anna Pabori
1994: Marina Vasarmidou
1995: Maria Pachatouridou
1996: Maria Pachatouridou
1997: Christina Panagou
1998: Fani Chalkia
1999: Chrysoula Goudenoudi
2000: Chrysoula Goudenoudi
2001: Eleni Kalogerou
2002: Christina Chatzi
2003: Chrysoula Goudenoudi
2004: Fani Chalkia
2005: Christina Chatzi-Neag
2006: Christina Chatzi-Neag

High jump
1983: 
1984: Niki Gavera
1985: Niki Bakoyianni
1986: Niki Gavera
1987: Niki Bakoyianni
1988: Niki Bakoyianni
1989: Niki Bakoyianni
1990: Niki Gavera
1991: Niki Bakoyianni
1992: Niki Bakoyianni
1993: Niki Bakoyianni
1994: Vassiliki Xenou
1995: Niki Bakoyianni
1996: Niki Bakoyianni
1997: Vassiliki Xenou
1998: Niki Bakoyianni
1999: 
2000: Maria Chotokouridou
2001: 
2002: Maria Chotokouridou
2003: Nikolia Mitropoulou
2004: Nikolia Mitropoulou
2005: Maria Papageorgiou
2006: Persefoni Hatzinakou

Pole vault
1995: Georgia Tsiligiri
1996: Paraskevi Koumbou
1997: Georgia Tsiligiri
1998: Georgia Tsiligiri
1999: Thalia Iakovidou
2000: Georgia Tsiligiri
2001: Georgia Tsiligiri
2002: Georgia Tsiligiri
2003: 
2004: Georgia Tsiligiri
2005: Afroditi Skafida
2006: Antigoni Asteriou

Long jump
1983: Kyriaki Giannakidou
1984: Sofia Mavromati
1985: Anna Karamanli
1986: Voula Patoulidou
1987: Agni Georgiou
1988: Sylvia Kanakari
1989: ?
1990: Panayota Bisbiki
1991: Athina Papadopoulou
1992: Niki Xanthou
1993: Eleni Karabesini
1994: Voula Patoulidou
1995: Niki Xanthou
1996: Eleni Karampesini
1997: Niki Xanthou
1998: Paraskevi Tsiamita
1999: Niki Xanthou
2000: Christina Athanasiou
2001: Stiliani Pilatou
2002: Stiliani Pilatou
2003: Niki Xanthou
2004: Ioanna Kafetzi
2005: Ioanna Kafetzi
2006: Hrysopiyi Devetzi

Triple jump
1992: 
1993: Olga Vasdeki
1994: Efi Chatzi
1995: Olga Vasdeki
1996: Olga Vasdeki
1997: Sofia Bakatsaki
1998: Olga Vasdeki
1999: Paraskevi Tsiamita
2000: Ioanna Kafetzi
2001: Ioanna Kafetzi
2002: Hrysopiyi Devetzi
2003: Hrysopiyi Devetzi
2004: Hrysopiyi Devetzi
2005: Hrysopiyi Devetzi
2006: Hrysopiyi Devetzi

Shot put
1983: Soultana Saroudi
1984: Soultana Saroudi
1985: Soultana Saroudi
1986: Eleni Tsentemeidou
1987: Froso Vage
1988: Anna Verouli
1989: ?
1990: Eleni Tsentemeidou
1991: Eleni Tsentemeidou
1992: 
1993: Kalliopi Ouzouni
1994: Kalliopi Ouzouni
1995: Fotini Kyriakidou
1996: Kalliopi Ouzouni
1997: Eleni Tsentemeidou
1998: Eleni Tsentemeidou
1999: Kalliopi Ouzouni
2000: Kalliopi Ouzouni
2001: Kalliopi Ouzouni
2002: Kalliopi Ouzouni
2003: Irini Terzoglou
2004: Kalliopi Ouzouni
2005: Stiliani Papadopoulou
2006: Irini Terzoglou

Discus throw
1983: Vassiliki Panayotopoulou
1984: Vassiliki Panayotopoulou
1985: Georgia Giannakidou
1986: Georgia Giannakidou
1987: Georgia Giannakidou
1988: Magda Karava
1989: ?
1990: Ekaterini Voggoli
1991: Anastasia Kelesidou
1992: Styliani Tsikouna
1993: Anastasia Kelesidou
1994: Anastasia Kelesidou
1995: Anastasia Kelesidou
1996: Anastasia Kelesidou
1997: Anastasia Kelesidou
1998: Ekaterini Voggoli
1999: Anastasia Kelesidou
2000: Anastasia Kelesidou
2001: Ekaterini Voggoli
2002: Anastasia Kelesidou
2003: Ekaterini Voggoli
2004: Ekaterini Voggoli
2005: Areti Abatzi
2006: Areti Abatzi

Hammer throw
1995: Asimina Morfi
1996: Asimina Morfi
1997: Asimina Morfi
1998: Asimina Morfi
1999: Asimina Morfi
2000: Evdokia Tsamoglou
2001: Alexandra Papageorgiou
2002: Alexandra Papageorgiou
2003: Alexandra Papageorgiou
2004: Alexandra Papageorgiou
2005: Stiliani Papadopoulou
2006: Alexandra Papageorgiou

Javelin throw
1983: Sofia Sakorafa
1984: Anna Verouli
1985: Eva Tatarkioti
1986: Anna Verouli
1987: Anna Verouli
1988: Anna Verouli
1989: ?
1990: Anna Verouli
1991: Efi Karatopouzi
1992: Anna Verouli
1993: Antigoni Vourdouli
1994: Dimitra Sargioti
1995: Efi Karatopouzi
1996: Efi Karatopouzi
1997: Anna Koussoulou
1998: Anna Koussoulou
1999: Mirela Maniani
2000: Aggeliki Tsiolakoudi
2001: Mirela Maniani
2002: Aggeliki Tsiolakoudi
2003: Savva Lika
2004: Savva Lika
2005: Mirela Maniani
2006: Savva Lika

Heptathlon
1983: Elissavet Pantazi
1984: Despina Pakou
1985: ?
1986: ?
1987: Kornelia Nikopoulou
1988: Alexandra Kourli
1989: ?
1990: ?
1991: ?
1992: Alexandra Kourli
1993: Alexandra Kourli
1994: Athina Papasotiriou
1995: Athina Papasotiriou
1996: Athina Papasotiriou
1997: Asimina Vanakara
1998: Argyro Strataki
1999: Athina Papasotiriou
2000: Asimina Vanakara
2001: Anastasia Kivelidou
2002: Argyro Strataki
2003: Argyro Strataki
2004: Argyro Strataki
2005: Argyro Strataki
2006: Argyro Strataki

5000 metres walk
1985: Konstantina Bornivelli

10,000 metres walk
The 1996 championships was held as a road event.
1986: Konstantina Bornivelli
1987: Konstantina Bornivelli
1988: Kalliopi Gavalaki
1989: ?
1990: Kalliopi Gavalaki
1991: ?
1992: Kalliopi Gavalaki
1993: ?
1994: Christina Kokotou
1995: Christina Kokotou
1996: Christina Kokotou
1997: Christina Kokotou
1998: Christina Kokotou

20 kilometres walk
1998: Christina Kokotou
1999: Christina Deskou
2000: Christina Deskou
2001: Athina Papayianni
2002: Athanasia Tsoumeleka
2003: Athanasia Tsoumeleka
2004: Maria Hatzipanayotidou
2005: Evangelia Xinou
2006: Alexia Triantafillou

References

Champions 1983–2006
Greek Championships. GBR Athletics. Retrieved 2021-04-17.

Winners
 
Greek Championships
Athletics